Aroha is a Māori word meaning "love", cognate with the Hawaiian term aloha. It is also a given name.

Notable people 
Notable people with the name include:

 Aroha Awarau, journalist and playwright from New Zealand
 Aroha Reriti-Crofts, former national president of the Māori Women's Welfare League
 Te Aroha Keenan, New Zealand former netball coach
 Aroha Savage (born 1990), rugby union player from New Zealand
Neve Te Aroha Ardern Gayford (born 2018), daughter of New Zealand Prime Minister Jacinda Ardern

Fictional characters 

 Aroha Reed, character in the TVNZ soap opera Shortland Street

Other uses 

 Aroha is an alternate spelling for Hindi language word Aaroh.

See also 
 Te Aroha, a town in the North Island of New Zealand

References

Māori given names